Ross Harris may refer to:

 Ross Harris (actor) (born 1969), American actor, artist, and musician
 Ross Harris (composer) (born 1945), New Zealand composer and musician
 Ross Harris (footballer) (born 1985), Scottish footballer

See also 
 Harris Ross, long distance runner
 Justin Ross Harris, American computer scientist convicted of his son's murder